Polina is a hamlet in the Revúca District, Banská Bystrica Region, Slovakia.

Other uses 
 Pojan, Fier, a town in Abania near Ancient Illyrian Apollonia also called Polina.
 Polina (given name)
 Polina, a 2016 French film

External links 
 https://web.archive.org/web/20071027094149/http://www.statistics.sk/mosmis/eng/run.html

Villages and municipalities in Revúca District